This is a list of town tramway systems in the Czech Republic. It includes all tram systems, past and present; cities with currently operating systems, and those systems themselves, are indicated in bold and blue background colored rows. The use of the diamond (♦) symbol indicates where there were (or are) two or more independent tram systems operating concurrently within a single metropolitan area.  Those tram systems that operated on other than standard gauge track (where known) are indicated in the 'Notes' column.

See also
 List of town tramway systems in Europe
 List of tram and light rail transit systems

References 

Proof of Liberec's system is really dual gauge :
http://www.dpmlj.cz/vysledky-hledani?searchword=1435%201000&searchphrase=all

Tramways
Czech Republic